Lake Bokon is a large freshwater lake in Khabarovsk Krai, Russia. There are no permanent settlements on the shores of the lake.

According to local folklore, the lake is haunted by a beautiful and virtuous Evenk girl who was magically swallowed by the icy lake. She dwells in the bottom and legend tells that occasionally she may appear above the surface.

Geography
The lake is part of the basin of the Uda river, Tuguro-Chumikansky District. Bokon is the largest lake in the district. It is located below the slopes of the northwestern side of the Taikan Range.  
River Bokonchan, a right tributary of the Uda, is the outflow of the lake.

The area is covered in snow in late October, thawing takes place in May.

Flora
The banks of the lake are low and swampy, overgrown with marsh vegetation, such as horsetail and sedges, as well as scattered shrubs near the shores.

See also
List of lakes of Russia

References

External links 
Khabarovsk Museum of Local Lore in February 2020

Lakes of Khabarovsk Krai